Jiangsu Sainty Corporation Limited is a Chinese listed company based in Nanjing, Jiangsu Province. The company exported clothes to overseas.

Jiangsu Sainty was majority owned by Jiangsu Sainty International Group. However, it was merged with fellow state-owned Jiangsu Guoxin Investment Group in 2010, becoming an intermediate holding company.

History
Jiangsu Sainty Corporation Limited was incorporated in 1993 as a "company limited by shares" (similar to public limited company), by transforming a state-owned enterprise namely  (literally Jiangsu Province Garments Import & Export (Group) Corporation). At that time employee owned a minority stake of the new legal person. In December 1996, a new intermediate holding company, Jiangsu Sainty International Group was formed. In the next year Jiangsu Garments Import & Export Co., Ltd. was renamed to [Jiangsu] Sainty International Group Jiangsu Garments Imp. & Exp. Co., Ltd.. It became a listed company in 2000. Before the initial public offering, via Sainty International Group, owned 81.81% shares and was proposed to diluted to 60.38%.

In 2010, the parent company Sainty International Group was merged with fellow state-owned holding company .

Jiangsu Sainty also acquired a significant stake of a financial leasing company  (now ) from parent company Jiangsu Guoxin Group in 2013 (announced in 2012). However, in 2015 the stake was sold to a subsidiary of fellow state-owned enterprise Jiangsu Broadcasting Corporation.

Controversies
In 2013 Securities Daily criticized Jiangsu Sainty had a large sum of prepayment to a former related parties. Jiangsu Sainty clarified that the prepayment to the business partner was part of a normal operation, despite that company was owned by a former employee of Jiangsu Sainty.

References

External links
  

Companies listed on the Shanghai Stock Exchange
Companies owned by the provincial government of China
Chinese companies established in 1993
Companies based in Nanjing
Clothing companies of China
Clothing brands of China